This is a list of launches made by the Proton-M rocket between 2020 and 2029. All launches will be conducted from the Baikonur Cosmodrome. The Proton rocket is scheduled to make its last flight and be retired before 2030.

Launch statistics

Rocket configurations

Launch sites

Launch outcomes

Launch history

Planned launches

References 

Universal Rocket (rocket family)
Proton2020
Proton launches